The Jumping Bomb Angels were a female Japanese professional wrestling tag team. The members were Noriyo Tateno and Itsuki Yamazaki.

History

Japan 
Noriyo Tateno and Itsuki Yamazaki formed one of the most well-known teams on the Japanese Woman's Wrestling circuit. On January 5, 1986, the Angels defeated Bull Nakano and Condor Saito to win the vacant WWWA World Tag Team Championship. Then on March 20, 1986, Lioness Asuka & Chigusa Nagayo, the Crush Gals, defeated The Angels to capture the WWWA Tag Team titles.

World Wrestling Federation 
Tateno and Yamazaki entered the World Wrestling Federation in mid-1987 known as the "Jumping Bomb Angels". At the Survivor Series 1987, the Jumping Bomb Angels were the survivors in a women's Survivor Series match. On January 24, 1988 at the Royal Rumble, the Angels beat The Glamour Girls (Leilani Kai and Judy Martin) in a two-out-of-three falls match to win the WWF Women's Tag Team Championship. On June 8, 1988, the Glamour Girls defeated The Angels to recapture the WWF Women's Tag Team Championship.

Championships and accomplishments 
 All Japan Women's Pro-Wrestling
 WWWA World Tag Team Championship (1 time)
 World Wrestling Federation
 WWF Women's Tag Team Championship (1 time)
 Independent
 Women's World Tag Team Championship (1 time)

References 

All Japan Pro Wrestling teams and stables
Japanese promotions teams and stables
Women's wrestling teams and stables
WWE teams and stables